Permease of phosphotransferase system (or PTS-AG superfamily according to TCDB) is a superfamily of phosphotransferase enzymes that facilitate the transport of L-ascorbate (A) and galactitol (G). Classification has been established through phylogenic analysis and bioinformatics.

The bacterial phosphoenolpyruvate:sugar phosphotransferase system (PTS) transports and phosphorylates its sugar substrates in a single energy-coupled step. This transport process is dependent on several cytoplasmic phosphoryl transfer proteins - Enzyme I (I), HPr, Enzyme IIA (IIA), and Enzyme IIB (IIB)) as well as the integral membrane sugar permease (IIC). The PTS Enzyme II complexes are derived from independently evolving 4 PTS Enzyme II complex superfamilies, that include the (1) Glucose (Glc),(2) Mannose (Man), (3) Ascorbate-Galactitol (Asc-Gat) and (4) Dihydroxyacetone (Dha) superfamilies.

The four families that make up the PTS-GFL superfamily include:
 4.A.5 – The PTS Galactitol (Glc) Family
 4.A.7 – The PTS L-Ascorbate (L-Asc) Family

See also 
 Phosphotransferases system

References

Further reading 

 "TCDB - PTS-AG Superfamily". www.tcdb.org. 
 

Membrane proteins
Transmembrane proteins
Transmembrane transporters
Transport proteins
Integral membrane proteins
Protein superfamilies